Scott Hirsch is an American internet entrepreneur. He got his start in online business when he marketed contact lenses and other products online in 1992. He entered the commercial email marketing business in 1998 when he founded eDirect. In 2004, Hirsch founded Relation Serve Media, an interactive advertising agency also specializing in email marketing.

In 2009, Hirsch co-founded Appsbar Inc, which allows users to build their own apps. He currently runs Appsbar and is a boxing manager. Scott is also a writer and regular contributor to Huffington Post, Young Upstarts, Silicon Angle, and BetaNews.

App-building software 
Appsbar Inc in April 2011 launched a beta version of Appsbar, a desktop tool that allows users to build customized apps for use on smartphones and tablets. The program is free of charge and the end product does not feature advertising. The goal is to offer a simple way for everyday users to build their own professional-looking complex apps—free of charge. In 2014, TechRepublic published a review of 3 no-code Android app development platforms and reported that Appsbar is "ready to take on the task of creating a full-blown Android app for your business." The tool ensures that each app is compatible with popular online marketplaces including iTunes and Android Market.

In January 2012, Appsbar  had more than 60,000 users and was featured in popular media, including Inc., PC Mag, Fox Business,  and the Pittsburgh Tribune Review. By 2013, the Miami Herald  reported that Appsbar had “empowered more than 600,000 small businesses to build their own apps for free.” In January 2015, Business News Daily included Appsbar as one of “14 Best App Makers.”

Appsbar won the American Business Awards 2012 Gold "Stevie" for Best New Tech Company.

Internet marketing
Hirsch entered the commercial email marketing business (a.k.a. the spam game) in 1998 when he founded eDirect, which later merged with Naviant in 2002. Time reported that Hirsch sold Naviant to consumer credit giant Equifax for a staggering $135,000,000. The combined entity known as Naviant became one of the largest players in the Internet direct-marketing space. Naviant went on to be a leader in online registration trends, and introduced the concept of email data appending ("e-pending") to postal lists.

In 2004 Hirsch founded Relation Serve Media, an interactive advertising agency also specializing in email marketing. Hirsch took the company public on the American Stock Exchange in 2005 under the symbol RSVM. in 2008 Scott Hirsch founded DigDev, a digital media agency doing business as DigDev Direct.

Direct marketing 
Hirsch got his start in online business when he first marketed contact lenses and other products online in 1992. Lens Express opened its first full-service virtual store in the original AOL Mall. The company was featured in the early Bulletin Board System's O'Reilly's Web, Prodigy, and CompuServe. From 1986 to 1996, Hirsch was Vice President of Lens Express. The company was ranked among the 500 fastest growing private companies by Inc. magazine for 1993, 1994 and 1995. Owing to this venture, Hirsch continues to be quoted as an emarketing expert in mainstream press including Entrepreneur and The Street.

Athletics 
Currently, Hirsch is a professional boxing manager based out of Florida. He manages five-time World Champion and International Boxing Federation No. 1 ranked junior middleweight Cory Spinks. He was named the 2006 WBO's Boxing Manager of the Year and nominated by the Boxing Writers Association of America for the same award. His three heavyweights Shannon Briggs, Jameel McCline and JD Chapman went a combined 14-0 in 2006. He managed two-time heavyweight champion Shannon Briggs to seven consecutive victories and the WBO World Heavyweight title prior to losing a unanimous decision to Sultan Ibragimov in June 2007 in Atlantic City. He also guided Jameel McCline to six straight wins and a WBA title shot, which McCline lost due to a knee injury in January 2007 in Basel, Switzerland. He's built Arkansas heavyweight prospect, JD Chapman a record of 27-0 and helped him garner a #14 world rating in the WBC. Chapman has yet to face a rated contender. Hirsch's fighters are regularly featured on national television and on cards of major promoters including Don King, Wilfred Sauerland, Golden Boy, Main Events, Cedric Kushner and Duva Boxing.

Hirsch himself has participated in two professional boxing matches and won both fights by first round knockout.

A lifelong racquetball enthusiast, Hirsch played on the racquetball team at Providence College and won the Big East Intercollegiate Regional Racquetball Championship in 1985. Hirsch co-founded the Legends of Racquetball and Paddleball Tour in 2002 with six-time world champion, Marty Hogan and Steve Keeley. Hirsch served as executive director of the tour from 2002-2005.

Personal life
Hirsch was born in Miami, Florida on April 14, 1966. He graduated from Hollywood Hills High School and attended Providence College. He has two children. He resides in Boca Raton, Florida.

References

1966 births
Living people
American boxing managers